The IOOF Hall and Opera House in Bladen, Nebraska was built in 1913.  It served historically as a meeting hall, as a theater, and as a music facility.  It was listed on the National Register of Historic Places in 1988.

References

Theatres on the National Register of Historic Places in Nebraska
Buildings and structures in Webster County, Nebraska
Odd Fellows buildings in Nebraska
Theatres completed in 1913
Clubhouses on the National Register of Historic Places in Nebraska
1913 establishments in Nebraska
National Register of Historic Places in Webster County, Nebraska
Opera houses on the National Register of Historic Places in Nebraska
Opera houses in Nebraska